The 13th National Television Awards ceremony was held at the Royal Albert Hall on 31 October 2007 and was hosted by Sir Trevor McDonald.

Awards

References

National Television Awards
National Television Awards
National Television Awards
2007 in London
National Television Awards
National Television Awards